Nasi lemak is a dish originating in Malay cuisine that consists of fragrant rice cooked in coconut milk and pandan leaf. It is commonly found in Malaysia, where it is considered the national dish. It is also the native dish in neighbouring areas with significant Malay populations such as Singapore, Brunei, and Southern Thailand. In Indonesia it can be found in several parts of Sumatra, especially the Malay regions of Riau, Riau Islands and Medan. Nasi lemak can also be found in the Bangsamoro region of Mindanao, prepared by Filipino Moros, as well as Australia's external territories of Christmas Island and the Cocos (Keeling) Islands. It is considered an essential dish for a typical Malay-style breakfast.  Nasi lemak is featured as a national dish in most of the country’s tourism brochures and promotional materials.

It is not to be confused with nasi dagang, sold in the Malaysian east coast states of Terengganu and Kelantan (and its kindred region in Pattani, Yala and Narathiwat in Thailand and Natuna in Indonesia), although both dishes are often served for breakfast. However, because nasi lemak can be served in a variety of ways, it is often eaten throughout the day. The dish is also different from nasi katok in Brunei Darussalam, the latter is distinguished with the usage of plain white rice, a contrast from the coconut milk-base found in nasi lemak.

History
Nasi lemak was mentioned in a book "The Circumstances of Malay Life", written by Sir Richard Olof Winstedt in 1909.
With roots in Malay culture and Malay cuisine, its name in Malay literally means "fatty rice", but is taken in this context to mean "rich" or "creamy". The name is derived from the cooking process whereby rice is soaked in coconut cream and then the mixture steamed.  The rice is normally cooked with pandan leaves that gives it a distinctive flavour.

Traditionally, nasi lemak is served with a hot spicy sauce (sambal), and usually includes various garnishes, including fresh cucumber slices, small fried anchovies (ikan bilis), roasted peanuts, and hard-boiled or fried egg. As a more substantial meal, nasi lemak may also be served with an additional protein dish such as ayam goreng (fried chicken), sambal sotong (cuttlefish in chili), small fried fish, cockles, and rendang daging (beef stewed in coconut milk and spices). Other accompaniments include stir fried water convolvulus (kangkong),  and spicy pickled vegetables salad acar. Traditionally most of these accompaniments are spicy in nature.

Nasi lemak is widely eaten in Malaysia and Singapore. More commonly consumed as breakfast in both countries, it is commonly sold at hawker food centres and roadside stalls in Malaysia and Singapore. In Indonesia, nasi lemak is a favourite local breakfast fare; especially in Eastern Sumatra (Riau Islands, Riau and Jambi provinces). In Palembang, it is also a favourite local dish with the name "nasi gemuk". In Palembang Malay, "gemuk" has the same meaning as "lemak". This unique dish often comes wrapped in banana leaves, newspaper or brown paper, or in some shops is served on a plate. However, owing to its popularity there are restaurants which serve it as a noon or evening meal, making it possible for the dish to be eaten all day. Nasi lemak kukus which means "steamed nasi lemak" is another name given to nasi lemak served with steamed rice. In Malaysia, nasi lemak can also be found in a pasar malam (night market) with a variety of dishes.

On 31 January 2019, Google released a Google Doodle celebrating nasi lemak.

Variations

In Malaysia and Singapore, nasi lemak comes in many variations as they are prepared by different chefs from different cultures. The original nasi lemak in Malaysia is arguably a typical Southern and Central Peninsular Malaysia breakfast, and is considered of Malay origin. However, due to the popularity of the dish, it is regarded as a national dish.

The rice cooked in coconut milk is actually very common in Southeast Asia. This is the same process used to make similar rice dishes from their neighbouring country Indonesia, which are nasi uduk from Jakarta, nasi gurih from Aceh and Javanese nasi liwet. However, there are differences in taste because knotted leaves of Pandan screwpine are steamed with the rice to impart flavour and fragrance. Less often other spices such as ginger and occasionally herbs like lemon grass may be added for additional fragrance.

In the Northern West Peninsular, Nasi Lemak dishes typically incorporate curry into their recipe. The sambal served with the dish varies in spiciness, ranging from very hot to mildly hot, with a subtle sweet flavor underlying it.  Nasi lemak is not as popular as the indigenous nasi berlauk, nasi dagang, and nasi kerabu in North East Peninsular Malaysia. It is regarded as a speciality imported dish in Sabah and Sarawak. Hotels often feature nasi lemak on their menu with elaborate dishes, such as beef rendang and the addition of other seafood. Hawker centres in Singapore and Malaysia usually wrap them in banana leaves to enhance the flavour. Roadside stalls sell them ready packed, known as "nasi lemak bungkus", with minimal additions that cost between RM 1.50 – 6.00 per pack. Seafood outlets often serve the basic nasi lemak to accompany barbecued seafood. There are Malaysian Chinese and Malaysian Indian versions, and Singaporean Malay and Singaporean Chinese versions. Some people suggest that sambal is the most important part of a nasi lemak meal. If not prepared properly, it could ruin the dish, since Malaysians love food that is hot and spicy. A good deal of spirited and good-natured debate exists around this point.

Traditional Malaysian version
This traditional favourite offers sambal, ikan bilis (anchovies), peanuts and boiled egg. This is the most traditional version. Nasi lemak stalls can be found serving them with fried egg, sambal kerang (cockles) - a local favourite, sambal squids, sambal fish, chicken or chicken/beef rendang, squid fritters or even fried chicken or fish. It can be consumed for breakfast, brunch, lunch, tea, dinner and even supper.

A special feature is the rice, typically white rice, although brown rice may be preferred by health-conscious consumers. Cooked with fresh coconut milk, and sometimes with pandanus leaf (screwpine) thrown in, the rice is served on naturally fragrant banana leaves. This traditional serving style has been inherited for many generations—from a little stall at roadside to commercials, it seems like a simple way to fulfill the craving for this traditional food in cities.

Malaysian Alor Setar variation

Also known as Nasi Lemak Kuning (the yellow Nasi Lemak) or Nasi Lemak Royale (the Royale Nasi Lemak), such depiction of Nasi Lemak is more prevalent around parts of northern Kedah — especially in Alor Setar, as well as the state of Perlis. It has a distinct taste, composure, form and texture in contrast to a conventional Nasi Lemak. The rice is yellow in colour and commonly being eaten with curries, although some stalls may offer sambals. Thus, the rendition of the dish in Alor Setar can also be defined as a closer version towards that a Nasi Kandar. 

However, as both variations of Nasi Lemak are widely available and prevalent in northern Kedah and Perlis. The locals would commonly refer the traditional Nasi Lemak as Nasi Lemak Daun Pisang (Banana Leaf Nasi Lemak) to distinguish between the two diverged interpretations of the meal.

Malaysian Terengganu variation
In the east coast state of Terengganu, the Nasi Lemak is largely similar with the traditional Malay interpretation. However, Ikan Aye/Aya/Tongkol (Tuna) is one of the unique complimentary side dishes found in the state. The fish is commonly cooked in a sambal-styled sauce and eaten together with the Nasi Lemak. This regional version of Nasi Lemak is a highly popular breakfast option especially in Terengganu's coastal areas.

Malaysian Malaccan variation
In Malacca, the kangkung (water spinach) is usually being assorted to accompany the Nasi Lemak platter, a contrast from the cucumber that is commonly used in the standard version of the dish.

Malaysian Lemuni variation
Nasi Lemuni, also known as Nasi Lemak Lemuni — especially when the meal is paired together with the side dishes typically associated in a classic Nasi Lemak: sambal, fried anchovies and boiled egg.

The variation of the dish traditionally found in the northern Peninsular Malaysia. Its preparation is almost similar with the standard version of Nasi Lemak, however the former differs by the combination of Daun Lemuni (Vitex trifolia) in the coconut milk and rice admixture. The introduction of the herb influenced its taste, aroma and contributed to the dark grey and black colourings on the rice. It also believed that the Lemuni-rice is a healthier alternative of Nasi Lemak.

Malaysian Strawberry variation
Usually regarded as a unique Cameron Highlands specialty where strawberries are commercially grown and harvested. This variation of Nasi lemak saw a combination of the fruit in its sambal. The rice is also dark pink in colour, to highlight its distinct identity.

Malaysian Chinese variation
Although it is not common to see Malaysian stalls and restaurants selling nasi lemak, there is a non-halal version that contains pork, sold in towns and cities such as Malacca, Penang, Perak and certain parts of Kuala Lumpur. Some Malaysian Chinese hawkers are known to make pork and wild boar curry, sambal and rendang. It is available in most non-halal restaurant and it's served in variety of pork, such as luncheon meat, pork petai, Taiwan pork sausage, braised pork, and grilled pork chop.

Malaysian Indian variation

The Malaysian Indian variation is similar to the original version. However, many Malaysian Indians are Hindus, and thus do not eat beef. Nasi lemak in the Malaysian Indian version is served with curry, such as chicken curry, fish curry or lamb curry. Moreover, Malaysian Indians also serve a rendition of the dish alongside their very own version of rendang.

Indonesian Riau variation
 
Right across the Malacca Strait, the Malay Indonesians of Sumatran east coast shares close kinship and common Malay cuisine heritage with their Malaysian counterpart. As the result, nasi lemak is also native cuisine to Riau Island and Riau province. In archipelagic region like Riau Islands province of Indonesia, usually seafood are used to accompany nasi lemak, such as ikan bilis (anchovy), ikan tamban (Sardinella longiceps), ikan selar kuning (Selaroides leptolepis), sotong or cumi-cumi (squid) or small prawns. The Riau islands traditional nasi lemak is quite similar to Malaysian version; it comes as a platter of coconut rice wrapped in banana leaf, with cucumber slices, small dried anchovies (ikan bilis), roasted peanuts, hard boiled egg, and hot spicy sauce (sambal). The Riau islands version however, comes with an addition of small fish locally known as ikan tamban, usually fried with sambal chili paste and very crispy, the whole fish is edible. Prawns and squids are also commonly stir-fried in chili paste as sambal udang or sambal cumi. In Indonesia, nasi lemak is often sprinkled with bawang goreng (crispy fried shallot granules).

In Pekanbaru city in Sumatran province of Riau however, freshwater river fishes are commonly used as lauk to accompany nasi lemak. The freshwater fishes includes ikan selais (Kryptopterus cryptopterus) and ikan patin (Pangasius). Other fish such as ikan lomek (Harpadon nehereus) is also commonly used. These fishes are usually cooked in Minang style lado ijo (green chili pepper), minced and fried as perkedel ikan, or just plainly fried.

Indonesian Medan variation

Medan Melayu Deli nasi lemak version usually served with choice of side dishes either rendang (beef or chicken) or balado (egg or shrimp in chili sauce). A set of complete Medan's nasi lemak includes a sprinkle of crispy fried shallot, slices of omelette, kripik kentang balado (spicy potato chips), tempe orek (seasoned fried tempeh), perkedel (fried potato patties), sambal chili paste, slices of cucumber, and slightly bitter emping cracker. Some traditional restaurant chains have dedicated their business to serving nasi lemak Medan. Next to rendang and balado, the vegetable dish sayur masak lemak (vegetables including long beans, cabbage, and long green chilies in coconut milk) is also offered. It is a popular street food in Medan sold in humble tarp tents warung, and usually sold together with Lontong Medan. Since Medan is located near the Aceh border, and there are numbers of Aceh people that reside in the city, the term nasi lemak and nasi gurih are often used interchangeably in the city, since the terms refer to a similar coconut rice dish.

Singaporean Malay variation

For most of the Singaporean Malay variation, the sambal of the nasi lemak has more of a sweeter and less spicy taste when compared to other variations. As the sambal is a crucial portion of the nasi lemak, it is preferred to be less spicy so as not to overpower the taste of the coconut based rice and the other ingredients. The sides to this dish includes ikan bilis (anchovies), peanuts and an omelette or fried egg, which is rather similar to the Malaysian version, although the use of a boiled egg as with the Malaysian version is somewhat less common. Occasionally, a variant using the long grain basmati rice may also be found.  The rice is sometimes artificially colored green to suggest that it has been flavored with green pandan leaves.

Singaporean Chinese variation
Retaining the familiar aroma of pandan leaves, the Singaporean Chinese variation comes with a variety of sides that includes deep fried drumstick, chicken franks, fish cake, curried vegetables and tongsan luncheon meat. There is also the traditional way of serving it with just the ikan bilis (anchovies), peanuts and fried egg similar to the classic Malay version. Sometimes the rice is also coloured emerald green with the use of screwpine leaf extract or essence, commonly called pandan leaves, that perfumes the rice with a nice fragrance when added to the rice with the coconut milk as well as giving it its bright green colour. The use of the colour may have arisen as a gimmick to entice customers.

Vegetarian variation
In certain parts of Malaysia, hawkers and restaurants may offer vegetarian Nasi Lemak in which the dried anchovies and the shrimp paste for sambal are replaced with vegetarian substitutes.

Health
In March 2016, nasi lemak was mentioned as one of the 10 healthy international breakfast foods by TIME magazine. However, this opinion may be misleading as the writer might have been referring to the dish's "healthier" and smaller version, and comparing it to the larger American breakfast (fried bacon, eggs, pancakes/hash browns). A single, full size serving of nasi lemak with additional fried chicken, meat or fish, can be between 800 and well over 1,000 calories. The savoury coconut milk-infused rice also contains saturated fat, an ingredient connected to health problems, including diabetes. It is noticeable that although Malaysian main dishes have been related to high carbohydrate and protein contents, and lack of vegetables, a study done among 432 adults showed that Malaysian adults had a controllable consumption of local ready-to-eat cooked dishes as most of the dishes were consumed in low quantities.

See also

 Cuisine of Malaysia
 Cuisine of Singapore
 Cuisine of Indonesia
 Malay cuisine
 Mamak stall
 Nasi dagang
 Nasi uduk
 Nasi Kuning
 Nasi ulam
 Coconut rice
 List of steamed foods

References

Malay cuisine
Malaysian rice dishes
Indonesian rice dishes
Singaporean rice dishes
Philippine rice dishes
Bruneian cuisine
Thai rice dishes
National dishes
Malay words and phrases
Foods containing coconut
Steamed foods
Christmas Island cuisine
Cocossian cuisine